Steven Bailey may refer to:

 Steve Bailey (born 1960), American musician
 Steve Bailey (baseball) (born 1942), American baseball player 
 Steven Bailey (zoologist), zoologist published under the ICZN
 Steven John Bailey, real name of Steven Severin (born 1955), English musician
 Steven W. Bailey (born 1971), American actor